Consumer Alert was an American non-profit organization which advocated on business and consumer issues.  It was primarily funded by corporations.  It was founded in 1977 by Barbara A. Keating-Edh and John Henry Sununu, who would later go on to become Governor of New Hampshire (1983–89) and White House Chief of Staff during the George H. W. Bush administration.

The philosophy of Consumer Alert advocated free-market solutions to consumer dissatisfaction and promoted the belief that markets are best regulated by informed consumers.  In the organization's opinion effective consumer advocacy must steadfastly oppose any actions by government or industry that limits competition within markets.

Consumer Alert considered itself a conservative opponent to the liberal political bent of mainstream consumer advocacy.  Speaking of the legislation advocated by other consumer organizations Consumer Alert President Barbara A. Keating-Edh said:

The organization sued anti-nuclear-power activists in attempts to make protesters pay for the police presence at demonstrations.

Consumer Alert was originally based in Darien, Connecticut.  During much of its existence its offices were located in Washington, DC.

Articles from some issues are available online at TheFreeLibrary.com.

In 1989 Sununu was succeeded as Chairman by attorney William C. MacLeod who would later become director of the Federal Trade Commission's Bureau of Consumer Protection.

As of July 2010 the web-based organization registry of the Department of Consumer and Regulatory Affairs (DCRA) of Washington, DC, for the registration of Consumer Alert, Inc., file number 770925, shows status "revoked".  The DCRA site  defines "revoked" as: "An involuntary termination of charter or authority."

Consumer Alert has partially funded the Cooler Heads Coalition's website, globalwarming.org.

Financial Information

References

External links
 (domain expired after 2006-02-17)
  Barbara Keating-Edh. Consumer Protection Legislation vs. Liberty November 1981
Consumer Alert at SourceWatch
Consumer Alert at NovelGuide.com, archived.

Consumer rights organizations
1977 establishments in Washington, D.C.
Defunct organizations based in Washington, D.C.
Charities based in Washington, D.C.
Organizations established in 1977